William of Huntingfield (died  1225) was a medieval English baron, Sheriff of Norfolk and Suffolk and one of the Magna Carta sureties.

He held Dover Castle for King John from September 1203 (as a Lord Warden of the Cinque Ports) and in exchange, the king took his son and daughter hostage. He was granted the lands seized from his disgraced brother and appointed Sheriff of Norfolk and Suffolk for 1210 and 1211. In the First Barons' War he was an active rebel against King John and one of the twenty-five chosen to oversee the observance of the resulting Magna Carta.

He subsequently supported the French invasion of England, and took part in the Fifth Crusade, during which he died.

Family
William was son of Roger de Huntingfield and Alice de Senlis, who was a granddaughter of Simon, Earl of Huntingdon and Northampton.

He married Isabel, the daughter of William Fitz Roger of Gressinghall, Norfolk. Isabel had been twice widowed: her first husband was Berenger de Cressy, and her second Osmund de Stuteville. They had two sons and four daughters. William was succeeded by his elder son Roger.

Notes

External links
William at Magna Carta Barons site

1160s births
1220s deaths
12th-century English Navy personnel
13th-century English Navy personnel
Christians of the Fifth Crusade
Magna Carta barons
High Sheriffs of Norfolk
High Sheriffs of Suffolk
English feudal barons